25 & Alive Boneshaker is a live DVD released in November 2001 featuring Motörhead's 25th anniversary concert at Brixton Academy on 22 October 2000. The concert has also been released as a double live CD entitled Live at Brixton Academy in December 2003. 

The DVD also includes an acoustic session recorded at IHT Studios, Clapham, some Motörhead archive film, interviews with the band and their guests, and songs filmed at the Wacken Open Air on 4 August 2001.

Gold Disc 
In June 2008, Motörhead received Gold Disc presentations for sales in Germany exceeding 25,000 copies of the 25 & Alive Boneshaker DVD.

Cover artwork 
Joe Petagno, long time sleeve artist for the band, commented on the concept behind the cover for the DVD:
The idea was to create the feeling of tour posters being torn off the wall, one layer at a time, from 1975 to the present day... That was the basic idea: to create this montage of Motörhead through the years.

Track listing

Personnel
Adapted from the Live at Brixton Academy liner notes and from the allmusic website.

Motörhead 
 Lemmy – lead vocals, bass
 Phil Campbell – lead guitar
 Mikkey Dee – drums

Guests musicians 
 Whitfield Crane (ex-Ugly Kid Joe, ex-Medication), vocals on "Born to Raise Hell".
 Doro Pesch (ex-Warlock), vocals on "Born to Raise Hell".
 "Fast" Eddie Clarke (ex-Motörhead, ex-Fastway), guitar on "The Chase Is Better than the Catch" and "Overkill".
 Todd Campbell (Phil Campbell's son, S.K.W.A.D.), guitar on "Killed by Death".
 Paul Inder (Lemmy's son), guitar on "Killed By Death".
 Brian May (Queen), guitar on "Overkill".
 Ace (ex-Skunk Anansie), guitar on "Overkill".

DVD Special Features 
 Brixton concert specially mixed in Dolby 5.1
 Backstage interviews
 Six songs from the Wacken Festival 2001 in Germany
 Gallery of Motörhead members, past and present
 Lemmy and Phil playing "Ain't No Nice Guy" acoustic
 Obscure Releases gallery
 Multi Angle Footage during "I'm So Bad (Baby I Don't Care)"
 Moving Menus and Translations
 HTML pages of articles about the band

References

External links 
 25 & Alive: Boneshaker on Amazon.com
 25 & Alive: Boneshaker on the Internet Movie Database

Motörhead video albums
2001 video albums
Live video albums
2001 live albums
Albums recorded at the Brixton Academy